Khanom kho is a traditional Thai dessert from south of Thailand and made for auspicious ceremonies. Khanom kho is similar to khanom tom, a dessert from central Thailand. Khanom kho in previously it has only white color and now to make more beauty of the food, they mixed color form vegetable such as blue from butterfly pea flowers, green from pandan and yellow from pumpkin. There are two type of Khanom kho, one is dry and other is topped with coconut milk and known as khanom kho kathi

History 
In southern region of Thailand, it a Peninsula Area, In the past it was a trade market between the East- West such as China, India, Arab and Roman. The entry of traders has brought a doctrine to the country like Brahmin- Hindu and Buddhist and with a local belief. It became a culture of belief worship.

Beliefs 
Khanom kho is a traditional dessert from South of Thailand, Southern Thai folk dessert Malayu dialect is called “Tu Pong Nen”. The dessert that is passed down from generation to generation, from the beliefs of the local people the dessert is made for sacred dessert. Khanom kho kathi or khanom kho is similar to the laddu or ladoo a dessert from India that use to worship  Ganesh by using local ingredient.

Ingredient 
There are three part of making khanom kho kathi:

 Flour  
 Filling (coconut shavings)
 coconut milk (creamy coconut milk on top)  

The main ingredient is Glutinous rice flour, palm sugar , coconut milk and coconut shavings.

To make it colorful mixed a Glutinous rice flour with a pandan juice, butterfly pea flower or food coloring.

See also 
 Thai cuisine
 List of Thai desserts
 List of Thai ingredients (includes names in Thai script)
 Laddu

References 

 Jintana, 2019. "ขนมโคโบราณจากแหล่งใต้ – แหล่งเรียนรู้ด้านศิลปวัฒนธรรม." web log post, 30 April, viewed 10 April 2020,  < ขนมโคโบราณจากแหล่งใต้ – แหล่งเรียนรู้ด้านศิลปวัฒนธรรม>.
 เคียงดิน, 2011. "ขนมโค ขนมพื้นบ้าน ตำนานปักษ์ใต้." web log post, 22 May 2011, viewed 10 April 2020, <ขนมโค ขนมพื้นบ้าน ตำนานพื้นถิ่นปักษ์ใต้>.
 Ganesh Chaturthi 2019: 10 Popular Bhog to Offer to Lord Ganpati During the Festival 2019,Sushmita Sengupta, viewed 10 April 2019, <Ganesh Chaturthi 2019: 10 Popular Bhog to Offer to Lord Ganpati During the Festival>
 วิธีทำ ขนมโคกะทิ  เมนูขนมไทยโบราณหากินได้ยาก 2018, Gam.sali, viewed 10 April 2020,< แจกสูตรฟรี “ขนมโคกะทิ” ฟินตั้งแต่แป้งยันไส้ อร่อยถูกใจ หากินได้ยาก! on wongnai.com>

Thai desserts and snacks
Foods containing coconut